Postcolonial Theory and the Arab–Israeli Conflict is a 2008 book edited by Philip Carl Salzman and Donna Robinson Divine and published by Routledge Press. The book is based on the proceedings of a conference on  "Postcolonial Theory and the Middle East" held at  Case Western Reserve University in 2005.  The essays were first published in a special issue of the journal Israel Affairs.

Contents
The book contains the following essays:

Irfan Khawaja, “Essentialism, Consistency, and Islam: A Critique of Edward Said’s Orientalism”
Ronald Niezen, “Postcolonialism and the Utopian Imagination”
Ed Morgan, “Orientalism and the Foreign Sovereign: Today I am a Man of Law”
Laurie Zoloth, “Mistaken-ness and the Nature of the ‘Post”: The Ethics and the Inevitability of Error in theoretical Work"
Herbert Lewis, “The Influence of Edward Said and Orientalism on Anthropology, or: Can the Anthropologist Speak?”
Gerald M. Steinberg, “Postcolonial theory and the Ideology of Peace Studies”
Efraim Karsh, “The Missing Piece: Islamic Imperialism”
David Cook, “The Muslim Man’s Burden: Muslim Intellectuals Confront their Imperialist Past”
Andrew Bostom, “Negating the Legacy of Jihad in Palestine”
Philip Carl Salzman, “Arab Culture and Postcolonial Theory”
Richard Landes, “Edward Said and the Culture of Honour and Shame: Orientalism and our Misperceptions of the Arab–Israeli Conflict”
Gideon Shimoni, “Postcolonial Theory and the History of Zionism”
S. Ilan Troen, “De-Judaising the Homeland: Academic Politics in Re-Writing the History of Palestine”
Donna Robinson Divine, “The Middle East Conflict and its Postcolonial Discontents”
Irwin J. Mansdorf, “The Political Psychology of Postcolonial Ideology in the Arab World: an analysis of ‘Occupation’ and the ‘Right of Return’"

References

2008 non-fiction books
Books about the Arab–Israeli conflict
Israeli–Palestinian conflict books
Political books
Postcolonial literature
Routledge books